Paul Marwan Tabet  (born on 20 July 1960 in Bhamdoun, Lebanon) is the current bishop of the Maronite Catholic Eparchy of Saint Maron of Montreal.

Life
Paul Marwan Tabet joined the religious community of the Congregation of the Lebanese Maronite Missionaries on 26 September 1979 and the Maronite Patriarch of Antioch and all the East, Nasrallah Boutros Sfeir, consecrated him priest on July 20, 1986.

The Synod of the Maronite Church elected him in June 2012 to the Maronite Catholic Eparchy of Saint Maron of Montreal. His appointment was on January 10, 2013 by Pope Benedict XVI. Maronite Patriarch of Antioch, Bechara Boutros al-Rahi, OMM give him on 26 January 2013 his episcopal ordination, and his co-consecrators were Camille Zaidan, Archbishop of the Maronite Catholic Archeparchy of Antelias and Paul Nabil El-Sayah, Curial Bishop in Antioch. Tabet was installed in the office on 24 February of the same year. He replaced Bishop Joseph Khoury who served in the same position from 1996 to 2013.

External links

 Bishop Paul Marwan Tabet
http://www.catholic-hierarchy.org/bishop/btabetm.html
 http://www.gcatholic.org/dioceses/diocese/zmar2.htm

1960 births
Lebanese Maronites
21st-century Maronite Catholic bishops
Living people